Elena Krawzow (born 26 October 1993) is a blind German Paralympic swimmer who specialises in breaststroke and freestyle. She has macular degeneration, leaving her with only 3% vision.

Early life and career

Born in Mergen, a village in southern Kazakhstan, Elena Krawzow emigrated with her German-Kazakhstani family, moving to Russia, where she was diagnosed with macular degeneration. Whilst in Russia, Krawzow attend a boarding school for disabled children, before resettling in Germany aged 11.

Krawzow won a silver medal in the 100m breaststroke - SB13 at the 2012 London Paralympics before finishing fifth in the same event at Rio 2016.; she went on to win the gold medal in the same category at Tokyo 2020.

Personal life
In October 2020 Krawzow appeared topless on the front cover of the German edition of Playboy. She got engaged to her boyfriend Phillip in the aftermath of Tokyo 2020. In 2021 she was diagnosed with a malignant brain tumour.

References

External links
 
 
 

1993 births
Living people
German female medley swimmers
German female breaststroke swimmers
German female freestyle swimmers
Paralympic swimmers of Germany
Paralympic gold medalists for Germany
Paralympic silver medalists for Germany
Paralympic medalists in swimming
Swimmers at the 2012 Summer Paralympics
Swimmers at the 2016 Summer Paralympics
Swimmers at the 2020 Summer Paralympics
Medalists at the 2012 Summer Paralympics
Medalists at the 2020 Summer Paralympics
Medalists at the World Para Swimming Championships
Medalists at the World Para Swimming European Championships
Swimmers from Berlin
S12-classified Paralympic swimmers
German people of Kazakhstani descent
Playboy people